Cochran is an unincorporated community in Marshall County, in the U.S. state of Tennessee.

History
A post office called Cochran was established in 1882, and remained in operation until 1901. Beside post office, the community had a country store.

References

Unincorporated communities in Marshall County, Tennessee
Unincorporated communities in Tennessee